By My Side Again is a 1999 film directed by Gracia Querejeta. It was nominated for seven Goya Awards.

Cast

Production 
By My Side Again is a Spanish-Italian-French co-production by Sogetel, Elías Querejeta PC, Albares Productions, and Blue Cinematografica, with the participation of Esicma, Continental, TVE, Canal+, Tele Plus, and TVG.

Release 
It screened at the 47th San Sebastián International Film Festival in September 1999. Distributed by Warner Sogefilms, it was theatrically released in Spain on 8 October 1999.

Accolades 

|-
| align = "center" | 1999 || 47th San Sebastián International Film Festival || Best Cinematography || Alfredo Mayo ||  ||  
|-
| rowspan = "7" align = "center" | 2000 || rowspan = "7" | 14th Goya Awards || colspan = "2" | Best Film ||  || rowspan = "7" | 
|-
| Best Director || Gracia Querejeta || 
|-
| Best Original Screenplay || Gracia Querejeta, Elías Querejeta, Manuel Gutiérrez Aragón || 
|-
| Best Actress || Mercedes Sampietro || 
|-
| rowspan = "2" | Best Supporting Actress || Adriana Ozores || 
|-
| Julieta Serrano || 
|-
| Best Original Score || Ángel Illarramendi ||  
|}

See also 
 List of Spanish films of 1999

References 

1999 films
Spanish drama films
1990s Spanish-language films
Films directed by Gracia Querejeta
1990s Spanish films
1990s French films
1990s Italian films